The rufous-faced crake (Laterallus xenopterus) is a species of bird in subfamily Rallinae of family Rallidae, the rails, gallinules, and coots. It is found in Bolivia, Brazil, and Paraguay.

Taxonomy and systematics

The rufous-faced crake is monotypic.

Description

The sexes are alike. They have a blue-gray bill, legs, and feet. They have a rufous face, hindneck, and upper back; a white throat and belly; and a buffy ochraceous foreneck and breast. Their upperwing coverts, secondaries, and scapulars have black and white bars as do their flanks. Their tail and undertail coverts are black.

Distribution and habitat

The rufous-faced crake is found in northeastern Bolivia's Beni Department, in several states in south-central Brazil, and in central Paraguay. It is known from perhaps a dozen widely scattered locations in those areas but "given the suitable habitat in intervening areas and elsewhere[...]the species may be more widespread and less local than suspected." It inhabits marshes, especially the zones of moist to shallowly flooded tussocky or matted grass.

Behavior

Movment

No movements are known for the rufuous-faced crake.

Feeding

The rufous-faced crake's foraging techniques and diet have not been documented.

Breeding

Nothing is known about the rufous-faced crake's breeding biology.

Vocalization

The rufous-faced crake's song is "a drawn-out, slightly descending trill". It also makes "[s]oft call notes "piú piú'".

Status

The IUCN originally assessed the rufous-faced crake as Threatened but since 1994 has rated it as Vulnerable. Its known areas of habitation are small and widely scattered, and its estimated population of 2500 to 10,000 mature individuals is believed to be decreasing. Loss of habitat by conversion to agriculture (corn and soybeans) and silviculture (Eucalyptus and pines) has played a major role in the species' decline. "The most significant threat is possibly the widespread use of pesticides, fertilisers and other chemicals."

References

rufous-faced crake
Birds of the Pantanal
rufous-faced crake
rufous-faced crake
Taxonomy articles created by Polbot